Agorius baloghi is a species of ant-like jumping spiders.

Name
The species is named in honor of Hungarian oribatid mite specialist János Balogh, who collected the specimens.

Distribution
Agorius baloghi occurs in New Guinea and New Britain.

References
  (2003): New species of Agorius Thorell, 1877 (Araneae: Salticidae) from New Guinea. Acta Zoologica Hungarica 49(1): 61-69. PDF
  (2007): The world spider catalog, version 8.0. American Museum of Natural History.

Salticidae
Spiders described in 2003
Spiders of Oceania